In Mandaeism, the lofani, laufani, or laufania is a type of ritual meal commemorating the dead. It is etymologically related to the word laufa ("spiritual communion"), since lofani meals symbolize the connection of the souls of the living and the dead. The meal sometimes contains sacrificed sheep or dove meat.

It is distinct from the zidqa brika and dukrana, which are two other types of ritual meal offered for the dead.

Gallery
Lofani being prepared by Mandaean laypeople in Ahvaz, Iran:

See also
Sacred food as offering
Dukrana
Eucharist
Koliva
Laufa
Zidqa brika

References

External links

Lofani in Ahvaz, part 1
Lofani in Ahvaz, part 2
Lofani in Ahvaz, part 3
Lofani/Dokhrani (ritual meal for the dead): Lay Mandaeans in Iran (unedited clips and photographs)
Lofani/Dokhrani (ritual meal for the dead): as performed and explained by Tarmida Khaldoon Majid Abdullah

Mandaean ceremonial food and drink
Mandaic words and phrases
Funeral food and drink